Recension is the practice of editing or revising a text based on critical analysis. When referring to manuscripts, this may be a revision by another author. The term is derived from Latin recensio ("review, analysis").

In textual criticism (as is the case with Biblical scholarship) the count noun recension is a family of manuscripts sharing similar traits; for example, the Alexandrian text-type may be referred to as the "Alexandrian recension". The term recension may also refer to the process of collecting and analyzing source texts in order to establish a tree structure leading backward to a hypothetical original text.

See also

Biblical manuscript
Categories of New Testament manuscripts
Critical apparatus

References

Textual criticism
Textual scholarship

sr:Рецензија